Langobardisaurus (meaning Reptile of Langobardi, in reference to the Long Bearded People, an ancient Italian civilization) is an extinct genus of tanystropheid archosauromorph reptile, with one known species, L. pandolfii. Its fossils have been found in Italy and Austria, and it lived during the Late Triassic period, roughly 228 to 201 million years ago. The Langobardisaurus was first discovered by Italian paleontologist Silvio Renesto in 1994 from the Calcare di Zorzino Formation in Northern Italy.

Description

Neck and skull
The Langobardisaurus was a small reptile with a body size shorter than 50 cm.  Despite its small size, the Langobardisaurus featured a long neck with elongate cervical vertebrae featuring low neural spines. Atop its long neck, the Langobardisaurus had a large yet short triangular skull that featured a small rostrum and large orbits. Its large orbits are evidence of reliance on visual perception – this suggests that the Langobardisaurus likely had good eyesight. The Langobardisaurus skull morphology reflects its unique pattern of dentition. The front part of the upper jaw is toothless, although some grooves on the premaxilla have been mistaken to be teeth in the past despite their lack of enamel. Past this toothless region of the snout, there were larger tricuspid (three-pronged) cheek teeth on the maxilla and a large molariform tooth which is elongated in anteroposterior direction. This molariform tooth was flattened, with its occluding surface bent inwards and covered with tiny denticles. The lower jaw featured a similar molariform tooth which occluded with the aforementioned upper counterpart. Additionally, the lower jaw was robust and had a high coronoid process which suggests that the capability of a powerful bite. Given this and its distinct tooth pattern, these traits suggest that the Langobardisaurus performed excessive grinding of its food. However, none of the discovered specimens included the jaw articulation, so the conclusions that can be drawn are limited. A dentition pattern as described is certainly unique, and not found in any other 'protorosaur'. In an analysis of the Langobardisaurus jaw and teeth morphology, Renesto and Dalla Vecchia speculated that the Langobardisaurus survived on a diet of large insects, crustaceans, and small fish with tough scales. Additionally, it has been hypothesized that the Langobardisaurus used its long neck to pluck insects out of the air, in addition to burying its head deep into burrows to capture fleeing crustacean prey.

Tail
The long neck was opposed by an even longer tail, which featured 45 caudal vertebrae – making it twice the length of the trunk. Paleontologists hypothesize that the long tail of Langobardisaurus was a key adaptation for the genus that had significant impacts on its daily activity. A long tail allowed the Langobardisaurus to balance its body in a bipedal stance, despite its long neck. Able to stand tall on its hind legs, the Langobardisaurus could have utilized its keen eyesight and long neck (extended vertically) to survey nearby terrain for both predators and prey as shown in the image to the left.

Limbs
The fossil record shows that the Langobardisaurus featured short forelimbs dwarfed by much longer, hollow hind limbs. The tibia and fibula elements were slightly shorter than the femur. Moving distally, the tarsi were small and compact.
These facts suggest that the Langobardisaurus was capable of bipedal locomotion. Bipedal locomotion was undoubtedly a large advantage for the Langobardisaurus - such an adaptation would have allowed the animal to both chase after prey and run from predators. Based on the hypothesis that the Langobardisaurus fed on insects, crustaceans, and fish, the ability to run after prey afforded the Langobardisaurus a significant increase in its hunting capabilities, even if it was only able to run in short bursts. Based on the available morphological and geological information on the genus, paleontologists hypothesize that the Langobardisaurus had adaptation to aquatic life. Rather, the genus likely lived near marine environments - consistent with the proposition that it survived off of crustaceans found in tidal flats. The late Triassic topographical features of the regions in which the specimens were found further support this claim

Discovery

To date, five specimens of Langobardisaurus have been discovered. In addition to the Calcare di Zorzino Formation previously described - which produced two specimens, an additional two Italian specimens were discovered in the Forni Dolostone Formation of Northern Italy.
The most recent specimen of Langobardisaurus was found in 2013 in the Seefeld-Formation in the Northern Calcareous Alps of Tyrol Austria. This finding is significant as it expands the paleontological range of the genus, which was previously confined to Northern Italy.
Saller et al. described the geological setting: “All specimens were found in dark limestone and dolomite that formed in relatively small and deep marine basins surrounded by a shallow-water carbonate platform on which the peritidal sediments forming the Dolomia Principale/Hauptdolomit Formation were deposited”. The aforementioned basins lacked water circulation and ranged from insignificant oxygen levels to totally anoxic - making this environment suitable for preservation of vertebrate bones.

Classification and other proposed species

There have been three proposed species of Langobardisaurus, though only the first discovered, Langobardisaurus pandolfi, is considered taxonomically significant. The two other proposed species: Langobardisaurus rossii and Langobardisaurus Tonelloi are no longer considered to be unique species of Langobardisaurus. Langobardisaurus is considered to be either the sister-taxon of Tanystropheus or a close relative to Tanystropheus and Macrocnemus. These genera are classified to be a clade of archosauromorph diapsids called Protorosauria, although the clade may be an unnatural grouping. If this is the case, Langobardisaurus, Tanystropheus, Macrocnemus, and other close relatives (tanystropheids) may not be closely related to Protorosaurus.

Langobardisaurus tonelloi
Langobardisaurus tonelloi was first described by Muscio as a new species of Langobardisaurus in 1997 due to observed differences in phalangeal formula and limb bone proportion, though reinvestigation of these features has rendered them to be taxonomically insignificant.

Langobardisaurus rossii
Langobardisaurus rossii was first described by Bizzarini and Muscio in 1995. However, a detailed review of the specimen by Renesto and Dalla Vecchia led them to conclude that the Langobardisaurus rossii was a lepidosauromorph, and likely a rhynchocephalian.

References

Tanystropheids
Late Triassic reptiles of Europe
Fossil taxa described in 1994
Prehistoric reptile genera